Coyuca de Catalán is a city and seat of the municipality of Coyuca de Catalán, in the state of Guerrero, south-western Mexico.

Formerly called Coyuca, the town was named Coyuca de Catalán in honour of Nicolás Catalán, son of Antonia Nava de Catalán and her husband Nicolás Catalán, who lost his life there during an action in the Mexican War of Independence.

See also 
 Pineda, Guerrero

References

Populated places in Guerrero